The women's marathon at the 2013 Southeast Asian Games, the athletics was held in Naypyidaw, Myanmar. The track and field events took place at the Wunna Theikdi Stadium on December 16.

Schedule
All times are Myanmar Standard Time (UTC+06:30)

Records

Results 
Legend
DNF — Did Not Finish

References

Athletics at the 2013 Southeast Asian Games
2013 in women's athletics